Staw  is a village in the administrative district of Gmina Chełm, within Chełm County, Lublin Voivodeship, in eastern Poland.

The village has a population of 540.

References

Villages in Chełm County
Zakerzonia